Djamel Bouaïcha (born June 19, 1982 in Meftah) is an Algerian football player who plays for RC Arbaâ in the Algerian Ligue Professionnelle 1.

Club career
In the summer of 2011, Bouaïcha left USM Annaba for MC El Eulma. On September 10, 2011, he made his debut for the club, in a league match against CR Belouizdad. A week later, in his second match for the club, he scored two goals against WA Tlemcen.

References

External links
 
 

1982 births
Algerian footballers
Algerian Ligue Professionnelle 1 players
Living people
MC El Eulma players
Paradou AC players
People from Meftah
USM Annaba players
JS Kabylie players
MC Oran players
RC Arbaâ players
Association football forwards
21st-century Algerian people